The 1961 LPGA Championship was the seventh LPGA Championship, held October 12–15 at Stardust Country Club in Las Vegas, Nevada.

Defending champion Mickey Wright won the third of her four LPGA Championships, nine strokes ahead of runner-up Louise Suggs, the 1957 winner. It was Wright's third major title of the year and the seventh of her thirteen career majors. It was her tenth tour victory of the 1961 season.

Stardust Country Club opened earlier in the year and hosted the LPGA Championship for six consecutive years, through 1966. After several ownership and name changes, it became Las Vegas National Golf Club in 1998.

The purse was substantially increased in 1961 to $15,000 with a winner's share of $2,500, up from $8,500 and $1,500 in 1960.

Past champions in the field

Source:

Final leaderboard
Sunday, October 15, 1961

Source:

References

External links
Las Vegas National Golf Club 

Women's PGA Championship
Golf in Las Vegas
LPGA Championship
LPGA Championship
LPGA Championship
LPGA Championship
Women's sports in Nevada